The Cyprus warbler (Curruca melanothorax) is a typical warbler which breeds only on Cyprus. This small passerine bird is a short-distance migrant, and winters in Israel, Jordan and Egypt.

Like most Curruca species, it has distinct male and female plumages. The adult male is a small typical warbler with a grey back, black head, white malar streaks ("moustaches"), and, uniquely among typical warblers, underparts heavily streaked with black. The female is mainly grey above, with a greyer head, and whitish with only light spotting. The Cyprus warbler's song is fast and rattling, and is similar to that of the Sardinian warbler.

Together with Rüppell's warbler it forms a superspecies with dark throats, white malar streaks and light remigial fringes. This in turn is related to the species of Mediterranean and Middle East Curruca warblers that have a naked eye-ring, namely the eastern subalpine warbler, Sardinian warbler and Menetries's warbler. Both groups have a white malar area, but this may not form a clear streak in the latter group; above the white, the heads of males are uniformly dark.(The Sylvia Monograph, A & C Black, London; Jønsson & Fjeldså 2006)

This is a bird of dry open country, often on hill slopes, with bushes for nesting. The nest is built in low shrub or gorse, and 3–5 eggs are laid. Like most "warblers", it is insectivorous, but will also take berries.

References

Further reading 
 The Sylvia Warblers Monograph, A & C Black, London: ‘Sylvia Warblers: Identification, Taxonomy and Phylogeny of the Genus Sylvia’ (2001) by Shirihai, H., Gargallo, G., & Helbig, J. A. [Illustrated by Alan Harris; Photographic Editing and Field Photography by David Cottridge ; Edited by Guy M. Kirwan and Lars Svensson.]. (Helm Identification Guides)
 Jønsson, Knud A. & Fjeldså, Jon (2006): A phylogenetic supertree of oscine passerine birds (Aves: Passeri). Zool. Scripta 35(2): 149–186.  (HTML abstract)

Cyprus warbler
Birds of Southern Europe
Birds of the Middle East
Birds of North Africa
Endemic fauna of Cyprus
Cyprus warbler
Taxa named by Henry Baker Tristram